David Marshall Sadleir  (born 20 February 1936) is an Australian business consultant and former diplomat and ambassador, who was Director-General of Security (head of the intelligence agency ASIO) from 1992 to 1996.

Early life
Sadleir was born in Dehradun, British India. He settled in Australia in 1949, and attended Scotch College, Perth and the University of Western Australia where he graduated with a Bachelor of Arts with Honours.

Diplomatic and intelligence career
Sadleir joined the Australian Department of External Affairs in 1958. He was an advisor to the Australian delegations to the Inter-Parliamentary Union, and was posted in Tokyo and Washington DC as Assistant Secretary of the department's North Asia branch. From 1977 to 1981, he was Deputy Director-General of the Office of National Assessments, an intelligence agency reporting to the Prime Minister of Australia, under Director-General Robert Furlonger. He was a Permanent Representative to the United Nations and other international organisations in Geneva from 1981 to 1984.

In 1988, Sadleir was Australian Ambassador to China for a three-year term until 1991, when he became Australian Ambassador to Belgium/Luxembourg and the European Communities.

In 1992, Sadleir was appointed Director-General of Security, the head of the Australian Security Intelligence Organisation.

Consultancy career
Since leaving ASIO in October 1996, Sadleir founded a business and security consultancy company called David Sadleir and Associates.

In 1998, he conducted a review of Australia's entry control arrangements, in particular the Movement Alert List (MAL).

Honours
Sadleir was made an Officer of the Order of Australia (AO) in the 1991 Australia Day Honours, for services to international relations.

References

1936 births
Living people
Ambassadors of Australia to China
Ambassadors of Australia to Belgium
Ambassadors of Australia to the European Union
Permanent Representatives of Australia to the United Nations Office in Geneva
Directors-General of Security
Officers of the Order of Australia
University of Western Australia alumni